The Twin City Railroad Company was organized in 1912 as successor to the Twin City Light and Traction Company and acquired its subsidiaries, the Chehalis Electric and Traction Company and the Centralia Electric and Traction Company.  The company operated the 6.6 mile electric line extending from Chehalis, Washington (the “Rose City”) to Centralia, Washington (the “Hub City”) until 1936.

The line was constructed in 1910 by the Twin City Light and Traction Company's subsidiaries.  The line then passed through the hands of the Washington and Oregon Corporation (1912 - October 30, 1925), the North Coast Power Company (October 30, 1925 - 1923), and the Puget Sound Power and Light Company (from 1923).  The lines were managed by Stone and Webster.  The passenger service ended in 1929; freight was carried until 1932; between 1932 in 1936, only 3.50 miles of track were utilized for switching service.  Some of the track has been taken over by the Cowlitz, Chehalis and Cascade Railway Company, a Weyerhaeuser Timber Company subsidiary.  Ownership in the Twin City Railroad Company and its wholly owned subsidiaries, the Chehalis Electric and Traction Company and the Centralia Electric and Traction Company, was passed on to the Puget Sound Power and Light Company in 1923.  In 1936, the road was abandoned.

References

Transportation in Washington (state)
Centralia, Washington
Chehalis, Washington